Louise Nalbandian was an American Armenian historian and professor in the History Department at California State University, Fresno from 1964 to 1974. She was the author of The Armenian Revolutionary Movement: The Development of Armenian Political Parties Through the Nineteenth Century.

References

External links 
Pioneer of Armenian Studies at Fresno State

21st-century American historians
American people of Armenian descent
California State University, Fresno faculty
Living people
American women historians
21st-century American women writers
Year of birth missing (living people)
Historians from California